C/o Footpath (or Care of Footpath) is a 2009 Indian Kannada-language film directed by Master Kishan, who also stars in the film. It is first film produced by the Kiran Movie Makers of Bangalore, India. It was directed by the world's then-youngest film director, Guinness Record Holder Kishan Shrikanth. Shrikanth has since been surpassed as the world's youngest director by Saugat Bista, the 7-year-old director of Love You Baba.

C/o Footpath had a budget of 20 million rupees (about $450,000). The shoot lasted for 55 days, over a period of 5–6 months. Filming took place in Mumbai. The film was released in 2006 with a running time of 135 minutes. It received the Best Children's Film Award at the 54th National Film Awards.

It was dubbed into other Indian languages including Hindi, Oriya, Malayalam, Telugu and Tamil (as Sadhanai) as well as English. A sequel released in 2015.

Synopsis
An orphan slum boy is adopted by an old lady who finds him on a footpath. He lives with her in the slums, where he makes a living picking up rags. Some school students call him an uneducated brute, which gives him the impetus to get educated. The story tells how he battles the odds of his circumstances to get an education.

Cast 
 Master Kishan as Slummu
 Tara as Saraswati Teacher
B. Jayashree as Slummu's care taking mother
 Saurabh Shukla
Mukhyamantri Chandru
Sudeep as Shankar in a Guest Appearance
 Jackie Shroff Guest Appearance

Awards

54th National Film Awards:
 Best Children's Film

Karnataka State Film Awards:
 Best Child Actor - Kishan Shrikanth
 Special Award 

SICA (South India Cinematographers Association Awards):
 Special Jury Award (for directing & acting) - Kishan Shrikanth

References

External links
 
Rediff review

2006 films
Indian children's films
2000s Kannada-language films
Best Children's Film National Film Award winners